Harrisburg (formerly, Harrisberry) is an unincorporated community in Inyo County, California. It lies at an elevation of 4987 feet (1520 m).

The town was originally named for Shorty Harris and Peter Aguerreberry, discoverers of gold near the site in 1905.

References

Unincorporated communities in California
Unincorporated communities in Inyo County, California